Infante Dom Afonso of Braganza, Duke of Porto (31 July 1865 in Palace of Ajuda, Lisbon – 21 February 1920 in Naples, Italy) was a Portuguese Infante of the House of Braganza, the son of King Luis I of Portugal and his wife, Maria Pia of Savoy. From 1908 to the abolition of the Portuguese monarchy in 1910 he was the Prince Royal of Portugal as heir presumptive to his nephew, King Manuel II.

Early life
Dom Afonso had a military career. In fact, he was a general of some considerable competence in the Portuguese Army, where, previously, he had been the inspector-general of artillery. His exemplary military background allowed him to be chosen to command military forces at Goa, at the end of the nineteenth century, when he was, concurrently, Viceroy of India. His performance in India motivated his nomination to be Constable of Portugal. In the early months of 1890, his engagement to Archduchess Marie Valerie of Austria was publicised, but later she refused to marry him, under the influence of her aunt by marriage, Archduchess Maria Theresa of Austria, of the Miguelist branch of the Braganza Dynasty.

When threats on the life of his brother, Carlos, became known to him, he adopted the habit of arming himself with a revolver, night and day, making himself ready to defend his family whenever it might be necessary. He urged his nephew, the Prince Royal, Luís Filipe, to carry a weapon as well.

Dom Afonso was a lady's man, known for his kindness, simplicity, and bon-vivant lifestyle. For instance, he liked to act as a fireman with the Ajuda Fire Corps near the Palace of Ajuda, which he patronized as honorary commander-in-chief. He lived at the Palace of Ajuda with the queen mother, Maria Pia of Savoy, after King Luis's death. (His brother, the king, Carlos, and, later, his nephew, the king, Manuel II, both lived at the Palace of Necessidades during their reigns.)

Dom Afonso was also a lover of automobile races, and he was responsible for the first motor races in Portugal, where he was one of the first drivers. After the proclamation of the Portuguese First Republic in 1910, Afonso went into exile abroad, first at Gibraltar with his nephew, the deposed king, Manuel II, and afterwards to Italy with his mother, Queen Maria Pia. He lived with her at Turin, and, after her death, he moved to Rome, and, finally, to Naples.

Marriage
Suffering, like his mother, the dowager Queen Maria Pia of Savoy, from debilitating mental and emotional health after the Regicide of 1908, Afonso de Bragança married, in Rome on 26 September 1917, a twice-divorced, and once-widowed, American heiress Nevada Stoody Hayes. This was a politically significant event, at least to those Portuguese royalists who clung to the hope of a restoration of the House of Braganza: as significant funding for any power grab was urgently needed.

As of 1917, the Portuguese pretender, Manuel II, was living in England with his wife of four years, the Princess Augusta Victoria of Hohenzollern-Sigmaringen, but they had no children. The royalists were apprehensive about the prospects for a legitimate Braganza heir, and their anxiety redoubled at the news of Afonso's marriage to a commoner, especially one of such a dubious reputation.

In Portugal, morganatic marriage was not forbidden. Any legitimate child of Afonso and Nevada could become the lawful heir to the Portuguese throne. Nearly as disturbing was the prospect that both Manuel and Afonso would fail to produce an heir. In this event, the claimant to the Portuguese throne would be a descendant of Miguel I, the absolutist king who, in 1834, lost the Portuguese War of the Two Brothers to the liberal line of constitutional monarchs.

Dom Afonso was the fourth husband of Nevada Stoody Hayes. They were unable to marry religiously in Italy, where the king of Italy, Victor Emmanuel III, like the Pope, chose not to recognize the validity of a previous trial marriage in Rome. She convinced Afonso to marry her again at a Madrid hotel, where a consular officer of the Portuguese Republic performed the civil ceremony, with no family or friends as witnesses. Some believe that the Portuguese consul in Madrid was as cooperative as he was because the Republican government in power at Lisbon was delighted to see one of the last of the Braganzas do such an unpopular thing. A religious marriage ceremony was performed in Madrid on 23 November 1917.

The Prince had previously tried to get the king's approval for his marriage, but he found that his nephew and the rest of the royal family were vehemently opposed to it. After his marriage, his pension was cut by Manuel II, and Dom Afonso, also rejected by his relatives in the Italian royal family, began to live in obscurity and sickness during his final days. He finally died alone, in Naples, on 21 February 1920. Only one Portuguese servant remained with him until the end.

Even though the terms of a morganatic marriage exclude the surviving spouse from inheriting any of the titles or privileges that are the prerogatives of royalty, they do not exclude the survivor from inheriting property. In his will, Dom Afonso left his entire estate to Nevada Stoody Hayes.

After he and Manuel II had both died (1932), his widow demanded that the Portuguese government recognize her rights to a substantial part of the House of Braganza's patrimony. Her husband had named her his sole legal heir in his last will. As the marriage, and the will, was legally disputed in Lisbon, Nevada was briefly arrested shortly after she arrived at Lisbon to claim her inheritance. Eventually, however, she proved a substantial portion of her claim, and she was officially granted the right to remove many objects of art and expensive goods from the Portuguese royal palaces.

The 35-year-old former Duchess of Porto traveled to Portugal from Italy with the body of her late husband, and she arranged for its installation in the Braganza pantheon in Lisbon.

Name, titles, and honors

His full name was Afonso Henrique Maria Luís Pedro de Alcântara Carlos Humberto Amadeu Fernando António Miguel Rafael Gabriel Gonzaga Xavier Francisco de Assis João Augusto Júlio Volfando Inácio de Saxe-Coburgo-Gotha e Bragança.

Insofar as titles are concerned, Afonso was, first and foremost, Infante of Portugal. The Infante Afonso was born during the reign of his father, Luís I, and, at birth, he was granted the title, Duke of Porto. He became Prince Royal of Portugal under unfortunate circumstances. His brother, Carlos I, and his nephew, were assassinated in 1908, whereupon Manuel II became king and Afonso was acknowledged as the heir to the throne, a position that takes the title, Prince Royal.

Before becoming Prince Royal, Afonso fulfilled the charges of 51st Viceroy of Portuguese India and 24th Constable of Portugal. He was the 109th and last Governor of Portuguese India to receive the title of viceroy, which is reserved, as a high personal reward for service to Portugal, to aristocracy of the highest standing and royalty only.

He received the following awards:
 Grand Cross of the Sash of the Two Orders (Portugal)
 Grand Cross of the Order of the Immaculate Conception of Vila Viçosa (Portugal)
 Grand Cross of the Order of St. Stephen, 1888 (Austria-Hungary)
 Grand Cross of the Saxe-Ernestine House Order, 1885 (Ernestine duchies)
 Knight of the Annunciation, 15 June 1893 (Italy)
 Knight of the Black Eagle (Prussia)
 Knight of the Rue Crown (Saxony)
 Knight of the Order of the Royal House of Chakri, 23 October 1897 (Siam)
 Knight of the Golden Fleece, 11 December 1883 (Spain)
 Grand Cross of the Order of Charles III, 11 December 1886 (Spain)
 Knight of the Seraphim, 24 December 1883 (Sweden-Norway)
 Honorary Grand Cross of the Royal Victorian Order, 7 April 1903 (United Kingdom)

Ancestry

See also
Lisbon regicide
Proclamation of the Portuguese Republic

References

|-

|-

|-

1865 births
1920 deaths
Portuguese infantes
House of Braganza-Saxe-Coburg and Gotha
Knights of the Golden Fleece of Spain
Dukes of Porto
Princes Royal of Portugal
Burials at the Monastery of São Vicente de Fora
Grand Crosses of the Order of Saint Stephen of Hungary
2
2
Knights Grand Cross of the Order of the Immaculate Conception of Vila Viçosa
Honorary Knights Grand Cross of the Royal Victorian Order
People from Lisbon
Constables of Portugal
19th-century Portuguese people
Sons of kings
Non-inheriting heirs presumptive